The Swedish Hotel and Restaurant Workers' Union (HRF) is a trade union in Sweden.

History
The union was founded in on 31 March 1918 in Gothenburg as the Swedish Hotel and Restaurant Personnel Union, bringing together local unions from Gothenburg, Helsingborg and Stockholm.  It originally had 2,498, a total which fluctuated over the next 15 years.  In 1932, it affiliated to the Swedish Trade Union Confederation, and membership grew steadily, reaching a peak of 59,681 in 1999.  Since then, it fell rapidly, and in 2019 membership stood at 26,562.

Presidents
1950: Arne Axelsson
1968: Sigvard Nyström
1978: Hans Billström
1988: Seine Svensk
1990s: Birgitta Kihlberg
2005: Ella Niia
2014: Therese Guovelin
2016: Malin Ackholt

References

External links

Swedish Trade Union Confederation
Hospitality industry trade unions
Trade unions in Sweden
Trade unions established in 1918
1918 establishments in Sweden